Shipwreck is a book published in 1974 that contains text by John Fowles and photography by The Gibsons of Scilly.

Photography 
Four generations of The Gibsons of Scilly captured the images of the various sailing vessels and steamers wrecked on the coasts of the Scilly Isles and West Cornwall from the 1860s onwards.

References

1974 non-fiction books
British non-fiction books
History of the Isles of Scilly
Jonathan Cape books
Books of photographs